The Muqaddimat al-Adab is a Persian and Chagatai dictionary written by Zamakhshari to teach Arabic in the 12th century. In the 14th century, Mongolian was also added to this dictionary. The first manuscript was found in Bukhara by Abdurauf Fitrat. The oldest surviving copies of the work belong to the 13th–15th centuries. The work, which contains information about the dialects of the Oghuz, Kipchak, and Kangly Turks, was used as a textbook in madrasahs for years. It is one of the most important works after Dīwān Lughāt al-Turk for the Middle Turkic period. It was also essential for the Mongolian language in the 14th century.

Mongolian vocabulary

References

External links
 Muqaddimat al-Adab, Digital Library of the Middle East

Persian dictionaries
Mongolian dictionaries